In 2019, newspapers and netizens of Bangladesh alleged that an excess of  was spent on the construction of residential areas for Rooppur Nuclear Power Plant, which is Bangladesh's first nuclear power plant. The allegations and further events became popularly known as the Rooppur pillow scandal in the country. In December 2019, the Anti Corruption Commission arrested 13 people for corruption and the matter remains sub judice.

Background

In 2016, ground preparation work of the nuclear power plant at Rooppur commenced. The Russian government would fund the 90 percent of the $12.65 billion contract through loan. The two units generating 2.4 GWe are planned to be operational in 2023 and 2024. Russian corporation Rosatom will operate the units for the first year before Bangladeshi operators take over. Russia will supply the nuclear fuel and retrieve spent nuclear fuel.

Scandal 
The documents of the housing project, called as Green City, were published and in May 2019, excessive prices listed in the document prompted allegations of corruption. According to the ministry's expenditure policy, the central authority must approve purchases above . Three contracting companies were hired to purchase these products. Among these, the goods supplied by Sajin Enterprise were of low quality. The media outlets like Prothom Alo and Pabna Samachar reported that Golam Faruk Khandakar Prince, MP of the area, was involved with this organization. Another contractor, Majid Sons, was reported to have been negligent in the supply of construction products.

Reaction

Authorities
The Secretary of the Ministry of Science and Technology assured action against the accused of the incident. The then Secretary of the Housing and Public Works Ministry claimed to have formed a committee to determine the price of the products. However, no comment about its progress was made. Shawkat Akbar, project director of the Rooppur Nuclear Power Plant, said the documented expenditure was not unreasonable. He also said that he would be held accountable to the Planning Commission. According to the newspaper Jugantor, the people of authority think that Mosharraf Hossain should take responsibility for the incident as he was the minister of Public Works during the scandal.

People
Iftekharuzzaman, the executive director of Transparency International Bangladesh, expressed concern over the corruption. The people of Bangladesh trolled and shared memes about the scandal. Economist Khondaker Ibrahim Khaled, former Deputy Governor of Bangladesh Bank, said that corruption in Bangladesh will increase if the government does not reprimand the scandal's offenders. On 20 May 2019, two organizations in Dhaka began protests against the corruption and held pillows in their march. Protesters described this corruption as the "greatest loot in history".

Aftermath
After the scandal, the government formed a three-member committee to investigate. They released a report on 23 July 2019, which suggested a list of 33 people involved with the scam. On 7 November, the Anti Corruption Commission summoned them to their office for further questioning. Three days later, the accused executive engineer Masudul Alam was questioned. On 12 December, the Anti Corruption Commission arrested 13 people for corruption: one executive engineer, three sub-divisional engineers, four deputy engineers, three assistant engineers and two contractors. The project was sued for corruption and money embezzlement.

After the arrest, deputy engineer Shafiqul Islam applied for bail. The High Court denied the bail on 5 July 2020. On 25 October 2021, Samakal reported the accused contractor had returned the money from the purchase. Shahadat Hossain of Sajin Construction was granted bail on 28 August 2020. In September, the Anti Corruption Commission appealed this, seeking the bail's cancellation. The High Court then ruled in favour of the Commission and the bail was canceled and further appealed to ban international travels for Hossain. In the same month, the High Court gave the government six months to resolve three cases in the scam.

References

2019 in Bangladesh
2020 in Bangladesh
Political scandals in Bangladesh
Corruption in Bangladesh
Pabna District
2010s fads and trends
Internet memes introduced in 2019